Robert Gomis (born 1 May 1973 in Ziguinchor, Senegal) is a French karateka who won a silver medal at the 1999 European Karate Championships at the men's kumite 70 kg.

References

External links
 R. Gomislisting at Karaterec.com

French male karateka
1973 births
French sportspeople of Senegalese descent
Living people
Senegalese emigrants to France